Raimo Viljam Vistbacka (born 19 October 1945 in Kauhava) is a Finnish politician and former member of the Finnish Parliament. Vistbacka has a master's degree in law (varatuomari) and he was the rural police chief (nimismies) in Alajärvi in 1982–1996. He was first elected to the parliament in 1987, representing the Finns Party's predecessor, the Finnish Rural Party. When the Finns Party was founded in 1995, Vistbacka became the party's first MP. He retired from the parliament in April 2011.

In 2010 Vistbacka said that he hopes that the Finns Party will not have more than 10–14 MPs (the total number of MPs in Finland is 200). Vistbacka believed that a bigger parliamentary group cannot be controlled.

Vistbacka left the Finns Party in 2017 and joined the Blue Reform. He was one of the Blue Reform candidates in the 2019 Finnish parliamentary election but was not elected.

References

External links
Parliament of Finland: Raimo Vistbacka 

1945 births
Living people
People from Kauhava
Finnish Rural Party politicians
Leaders of the Finns Party
Blue Reform politicians
Ministers of Transport and Public Works of Finland
Members of the Parliament of Finland (1987–91)
Members of the Parliament of Finland (1991–95)
Members of the Parliament of Finland (1995–99)
Members of the Parliament of Finland (1999–2003)
Members of the Parliament of Finland (2003–07)
Members of the Parliament of Finland (2007–11)